Lucy Caroline Smith (née Dahl; 12 October 1934 – 27 August 2013) was a Norwegian legal scholar and professor of law at the University of Oslo. She served as rector of the university from 1993 to 1998.

She was a member of the Norwegian Academy of Science and Letters. In 1987 she became Norway's first female (full) professor of law. She has published the book Foreldremyndighet og barnerett. Smith was a member of the U.N. Committee on the Rights of the Child. In the 1980s, Smith became well-known to the public as the principal judge of the popular quiz show Kvitt eller dobbelt.

Smith was the wife of Carsten Smith, the former Chief Justice of Norway's Supreme Court. Before that appointment, he was also a law professor at the University of Oslo.

Education
After attending Oslo Cathedral School, Smith studied law, graduating in 1959.

References

1934 births
20th-century Norwegian lawyers
Norwegian legal scholars
Academic staff of the Faculty of Law, University of Oslo
Rectors of the University of Oslo
Members of the Norwegian Academy of Science and Letters
Children's rights
United Nations experts
Norwegian women academics
People educated at Oslo Cathedral School
2013 deaths
Norwegian women lawyers
Norwegian officials of the United Nations
Women heads of universities and colleges
Women legal scholars